The Humboldt Prize, the Humboldt-Forschungspreis in German, also known as the Humboldt Research Award, is an award given by the Alexander von Humboldt Foundation of Germany to internationally renowned scientists and scholars who work outside of Germany in recognition of their lifetime's research achievements. Recipients are "academics whose fundamental discoveries, new theories or insights have had a significant impact on their own discipline and who are expected to continue producing cutting-edge academic achievements in the future". The prize is currently valued at €60,000 with the possibility of further support during the prize winner's life. Up to one hundred such awards are granted each year. Nominations must be submitted by established academics in Germany.

The award is named after the Prussian naturalist and explorer Alexander von Humboldt.

Past winners

Biology  
Günter Blobel,
Serge Daan,
Aaron M. Ellison,
Eberhard Fetz,
Daniel Gianola,
Hendrikus Granzier,
Dan Graur,
Bert Hölldobler,
Sergej Nedospasov,
Hans Othmer,
John M. Opitz,
Burkhard Rost (2009),
Thomas Dyer Seeley,
Günter P. Wagner,
Rüdiger Wehner,
Eckard Wimmer.

Chemistry  
Anthony J. Arduengo III,
Philip Bunker,
Sukbok Chang,
Paul Josef Crutzen,
Robert F. Curl,
Gautam R. Desiraju,
Kuiling Ding,
John Bennett Fenn,
Alice P. Gast, 
Walter Gilbert,
Robert H. Grubbs,
Narayan Hosmane,
Jean-Marie Lehn,
Goverdhan Mehta,
Chao-Jun Li,
Yuri Lvov,
Rudolph Marcus,
James Cullen Martin,
Debashis Mukherjee,
Kenji Ohmori,
Geoffrey Ozin,
John Anthony Pople,
Alessandro Piccolo,
Ronald T. Raines,
Roger Reed 
Julius Rebek,
Tomislav Rovis,
Richard R. Schrock,
Sason Shaik,
Peter Schwerdtfeger,
Oktay Sinanoğlu,
Yoshitaka Tanimura,
Matthias Tschöp,
Barry Trost,
Thomas Zemb,
Ahmed H. Zewail.

Computer Science  
Manindra Agrawal,
Patrick Cousot (2008),
Ken Forbus,
Michael Fellows,
Michael Franz,
Johannes Gehrke,
Jonathan Katz,
Leonid Levin, Bakhadyr Khoussainov, 
Andre Nies, 
Ivan Oseledets, 
Toby Walsh

Economics  
Kaushik Basu, Söhnke M. Bartram, Gérard Debreu, Francis X. Diebold, Jean-Michel Grandmont, Ronald Shephard, Hal Varian.

Engineering  
Moeness Amin, Constance J. Chang-Hasnain, Walter G. Chapman, Mohamed Gad-el-Hak, Andrew Jenike, Phoon Kok Kwang, Lanny D. Schmidt, Lefteri H. Tsoukalas, Mustafa Okyay Kaynak, Tarek Zohdi, Eckart Meiburg

History  
Andreas Daum, Tamar Herzog, Harry Liebersohn, Charles S. Maier, James J. Sheehan, Fritz Stern

Linguistics  
Matthew S. Dryer, Jaklin Kornfilt, Paul Kiparsky, Peter Austin (twice), Susan Rothstein.

Literary Studies
Rüdiger Campe, Liliane Weissberg

Management  
Timothy M. Devinney

Mathematics  
Dmitri Anosov,
Paul Balmer,
Ole Barndorff-Nielsen,
Leonid Berlyand,
Spencer J. Bloch,
Leonid Bunimovich (2003),
Dinh Tien-Cuong,
Rod Downey,
Alexandre Eremenko,
Christian Genest,
Dima Grigoriev,
Victor Guillemin,
Uffe Haagerup,
Harald Andrés Helfgott (2015),
Toshiyuki Kobayashi,
Konstantin Khanin (2021),
Alexander Komech (2006),
Robert Langlands,
Roberto Longo,
Benoît Mandelbrot,
Arnold Mandell,
Grigory Margulis,
David Masser (1990),
Vladimir Maz'ya,
Trevor McDougall,
Curtis T. McMullen,
,
Alexander Merkurjev,
John Milnor,
Katsumi Nomizu,
Teimuraz Pirashvili,
Gopal Prasad,
Svetlozar Rachev,
Arnd Scheel,
Shayle R. Searle,
Elias M. Stein,
Anatoly Vershik,
Ernest Borisovich Vinberg,
Joseph A. Wolf,
Raymond O. Wells Jr.,
Shing-Tung Yau,
Marc Yor,
Andrei Zelevinsky,
Thomas Geisser.

Medicine  
Fritz Albert Lipmann,
Stanley B. Prusiner

Meteorology  
Sharon Nicholson

Organizational Psychology  
Steven Rogelberg

Philosophy  
Colin Allen,
Michael Friedman,
Peter J. Graham (2018),
Panagiotis Kondylis,
Stephan Hartmann (2013),
Hannes Leitgeb (2011),
Jeff Malpas,
John Perry,
Jonathan Schaffer,
R. Jay Wallace,
Menachem Fisch, Lucy O'Brien (philosopher)

Physics  
Girish Agarwal,
Riccardo Barbieri,
Wolfgang Bauer,
Giorgio Benedek(1990),
Nihat Berker,
Nicolaas Bloembergen,
Robert W. Boyd,
Victor A. Brumberg (1993),
Ali Chamseddine,
Subrahmanyan Chandrasekhar,
Steven Chu,
Predrag Cvitanović,
Donald D. Clayton,
Hans Dehmelt,
Durmus A. Demir,
Tomasz Dietl, 
Emilian Dudas,
Gia Dvali, 
Alexei L. Efros,
R. Keith Ellis (2015),
Yuri Estrin (1999, 2012),
Andrea Ferrara,
Pierre-Gilles de Gennes,
Roy J. Glauber,
Chris Greene (2007),
Yuval Grossman,
Willy Haeberli (1982, 1991),
John L. Hall,
John W. Harris,
Theodor W. Hänsch,
Andreas J. Heinrich (2023),
Edward Hinds,
Robert Hofstadter,
Kyozi Kawasaki,
Jihn E. Kim,
Dmitri Kharzeev,
Victor I. Klimov,
Masatoshi Koshiba,
Dirk Kreimer (2011),
Herbert Kroemer,
Jeff Kuhn (2010),
Jay H. Lieske (1980),
Rodney Loudon (1998),
Andreas Mandelis,
M. Brian Maple,
Jagdish Mehra,
Eugen Merzbacher,
Curt Michel,
Rabindra Mohapatra,
Pran Nath,
Holger Bech Nielsen,
Hirosi Ooguri,
Valery Pokrovsky,
Martin Rickey,
Augusto Sagnotti,
Alfred Saupe,
Arthur L. Schawlow,
Julian Schwinger,
Ivan A. Sellin,
Qaisar Shafi,
Clifford G. Shull,
Costas Soukoulis,
Sauro Succi,
Ching W. Tang,
Anthony William Thomas,
José W. F. Valle, Jelena Vučković,
David C. Watts,
Gary A. Wegner,
Theodore Allen Welton,
Gary Westfall,
Paul Wiegmann,
Maw-Kuen Wu,
Stefano Zapperi, 
Guo Zengyuan,  
M. Suhail Zubairy, 
Kandaswamy Subramanian.

Psychology  
Stefan Hofmann, Mark van Vugt, Keith Rayner

See also 
 Alexander von Humboldt Foundation
 Humboldt Research Award recipients
 List of general science and technology awards 
 List of physics awards

Notes

External links 

Alexander von Humboldt Foundation

 
Science and technology awards
International awards
German awards
Alexander von Humboldt